Aryan Juyal (born 11 November 2001) is an Indian cricketer. He made his List A debut for Uttar Pradesh in the 2017–18 Vijay Hazare Trophy on 11 February 2018. Prior to his List A debut, he was named in India National Under-19 cricket team for the 2018 Under-19 Cricket World Cup. Juyal made his International debut against South Africa in the 2018 Under-19 Cricket World Cup in Christchurch, New Zealand.

Early life
Juyal was born in a family of doctors. When he was in class III, he was selected in the school team in his hometown, Haldwani, Uttarakhand. By the time Juyal was in class V, it was apparent that his talent needed to be taken seriously. While playing a tournament in Dehradun, Uttarakhand, Juyal was spotted by Ravindra Negi, a coach at Abhimanyu Cricket Academy and upon Negi's proposal, junior Juyal's father, Dr. Sanjay Juyal enrolled him at this Academy.  After an initial period of adjustment, the 11 year old Juyal settled into the residential cricket academy, which like the many boarding schools nestled in Dehradun, polished his raw talent into the finished product. Juyal started making regular appearances in the Uttar Pradesh Under-14 and Under-16 teams.

After two years at Dehradun, Juyal moved to Moradabad, where his mother’s family stayed. From there he would travel to Delhi, often staying in the capital for five days at a time. He trained at LB Shastri Cricket Club under Sanjay Bharadwaj, gaining match experience.

At their home in Haldwani, Juyal's father has built an indoor enclosure with one turf and one artificial wicket, and enough space for bowlers to take a full run up. In the monsoons when Juyal would not be able to play outdoors, he would go back to Haldwani to train at the indoor enclosure at home.

Career
Juyal made his debut in the Under-19 category for Uttar Pradesh. With 401 runs from five innings, he topped the batting charts for the Vinoo Mankad Trophy in 2017, and was in the top five of the Vinoo Mankad inter-zonal trophy. These performances earned him a slot in the Challenger Trophy, where he was the fourth highest run getter with 171 runs in four innings. In 2017 Juyal was selected for the 2018 Under-19 Cricket World Cup team, only the second uncapped player in the side.  In this tournament, India won the  finals against Australia on 3 February 2018, India's fourth U19 World Cup, the most by any team.

He made his Twenty20 debut for Uttar Pradesh in the 2018–19 Syed Mushtaq Ali Trophy on 2 March 2019. In November 2019, he was named in India's squad for the 2019 ACC Emerging Teams Asia Cup in Bangladesh. He made his first-class debut on 9 December 2019, for Uttar Pradesh in the 2019–20 Ranji Trophy.

In February 2022, he was bought by the Mumbai Indians in the auction for the 2022 Indian Premier League tournament.

Honours
After his debut in the 2018 Under-19 Cricket World Cup team, Juyal along with his coach Negi was honoured by the Uttarakhand Chief Minister Trivendra Singh Rawat in Dehradun.

References

External links
 

2001 births
Living people
Indian cricketers
Place of birth missing (living people)
Uttar Pradesh cricketers
Wicket-keepers